Joseph-Adolphe Tessier (December 17, 1861 – November 8, 1928) was a politician from Quebec, Canada.

Background

He was born on December 17, 1861 in Sainte-Anne-de-la-Pérade, Mauricie.  He was a lawyer and a senior army officer of the local military reserve.  He was married to Marie-Louise-Elmire Guillet.

Mayor of Trois-Rivières

He was Mayor of Trois-Rivières from 1913 to 1921.

Member of the legislature

He ran as a Liberal candidate in the district of Trois-Rivières in 1904 and won.  He was re-elected in 1908 and 1912.  He was Deputy Speaker of the House from 1912 to 1914.

Member of the Cabinet

Tessier resigned from his seat to accept a position in Premier Lomer Gouin's Cabinet and was re-elected in a by-election.  He served as Minister of Transportation from 1914 until 1921.

He was re-elected in 1916 and 1919.

Retirement from politics

Tessier resigned in 1921 to accept a government appointment.  He died in Trois-Rivières on November 8, 1928.

Footnotes

1861 births
1928 deaths
Mayors of Trois-Rivières
Quebec Liberal Party MNAs
Vice Presidents of the National Assembly of Quebec